Tom or Thomas Hoover may refer to:

Tom Hoover (basketball) (born 1941), American basketball player
Tom Hoover (drag racer) (c. 1941–2022), American drag racer
Thomas Benton Hoover, owner of the Thomas Benton Hoover House